Meredith Anne Bishop (born January 15, 1976) is an American actress, writer and producer. Bishop is best known for her role as Annie Mack in Nickelodeon's The Secret World of Alex Mack, which ran on the network from 1994–1998.

Bishop has appeared in numerous theater productions in the Los Angeles area over the course of several decades. In 1996, Bishop received a Los Angeles Drama Critics Circle Award for Best Lead Performance in Lee Blessings Eleemosynary. Bishop has also received two Ovation Award nominations, one for Best Lead Actress in a Play for The Concept of Remainders  and one for Best Featured Actress in a Play for her performance in Aftermath. Bishop also co-starred in Better at the Echo Theater, Complete at the Matrix Theater, and played a young Rose Kennedy in The Color of Rose  which premiered at the Kirk Douglas Theatre.

Bishop executive produced and starred in the 2003 film Klepto  which premiered at the 2003 CineVegas Film Festival.

Bishop is also known for co-producing and co-starring in the comedy web series Grip and Electric  for which she earned an Indie Series Award nomination for Best Actress in a Comedy. Grip and Electric, which co-starred Henry Thomas, Lin Shaye, Janet Varney, Burl Moseley, Izzy Diaz, and Andrew Burlinson, was favorably reviewed by the New York Times and TubeFilter.

In 2018, Bishop wrote, co-produced and starred in the short film See You Soon, a dark comedy which was an official selection at the HollyShorts Film Festival.

Bishop has also appeared on many network TV programs including Scrubs, Mad About You, Felicity, Good Luck Charlie and Agents of S.H.I.E.L.D.

Bishop has also appeared in numerous commercials including the KitKat "Jack-O'-Lantern" commercial, the Bud Light "Book Club" commercial  which aired during Super Bowl XLIV  and the GEICO "Reality Show" commercial which features a young couple competing in a fake reality TV show called Tiny House. "Reality Show" was listed among the top ten most popular GEICO commercials of all time.

 Biography 
Meredith Bishop was born in Los Angeles, but grew up in Woodland Hills, California. She attended William Howard Taft High School in Woodland Hills. Bishop has also trained as a jazz dancer and a classical ballerina.

Filmography

Film

Television

Theatre
Recent theatre performances include:

 Atonement (2007)
 The Concept of Remainders (2008)
 Breaking and Entering (2009)
 The Color of Rose (2010) 
 London's Scars (2010)
 AfterMath (2011)
 Complete (2013)
 Better (2014)

Awards and nominationsLos Angeles Drama Critics Circle Awards1996: Winner, Lead Performance for the role of Echo in "Eleemosynary"Ovation Awards2008: Nominated for Lead Actress in a Play for the role of Sophie in "The Concept of Remainders"
2011: Nominated for Featured Actress in a Play for the role of Natalie in "Aftermath"Indie Series Awards'

 2017: Nominated for Best Actress in a Comedy for the role of Heather in "Grip and Electric"

References

External links 
 
 

1976 births
Actresses from Los Angeles
American child actresses
American film actresses
American television actresses
Living people
People from Woodland Hills, Los Angeles
William Howard Taft Charter High School alumni